The St-Leonard Cougars were  a CJFL football team located in Saint-Leonard, Quebec. They played in the Ontario Football Conference from 1994-2013.

External links
St-Leonard Cougars (Official Website)

Canadian football teams in Montreal
Canadian Junior Football League teams
Saint-Leonard, Quebec
1986 establishments in Quebec
Sports clubs established in 1986